The Blessing Masonic Lodge No. 411, also known as Tres Palacios Masonic Lodge, in Blessing, Texas, was built around 1875 and moved to its current location in 1907. It was listed on the National Register of Historic Places in 2011.

It is a two-story  building which is Texas folk or vernacular in style. It was built near the Tres Palacios River in ca. 1875. It was moved to its current location at 619 Ave. B (FM 616), at 11th Street, in Blessing.

References

External links

Masonic buildings in Texas
National Register of Historic Places in Matagorda County, Texas
Buildings and structures completed in 1907